Lindsay Vickery (born 1965) is an Australian composer and performer.

Early life and education
Lindsay Vickery was born in Perth. He studied composition with John Exton and Roger Smalley at the School of Music, University of Western Australia. He has written much ensemble and interactive electronic music, exploring readymades and collage (notably interrogating the work of Charlie Parker) as well as improvisation, nonlinear writing and computer-performer pieces. His chamber opera Rendez-vous: An Opera Noir is based on the Nouveau Roman DJINN: un trou rouge entre les pavés disjoints by French author Alain Robbe-Grillet.

Career 
His interactive electronic music often employs experimental interfaces such as the Yamaha MIBURI and other self-devised alternative controllers.

He has performed on reed instruments, electronics or as a conductor in the groups alea new music ensemble, Magnetic Pig, HEDKIKR, SQUINT, Candied Limbs and Decibel, and with artists such as Jon Rose (Music in the Age of Shopping, The People’s Music),  Stelarc, Amy Knoles and Cat Hope. His works have been performed by groups such as The California Ear Unit, Topology, Clocked Out, Ensemble Scintilla Divina, the MATA Ensemble, The Collective and artists such as Michael Kieran Harvey, Ross Bolleter and Hiroshi Chu Okubo.

He has performed at the Shanghai International Arts Festival, Sydney Festival, Perth International Arts Festival, Adelaide Festival of Arts, Music at the Anthology, Totally Huge New Music Festival, Scintilla Divina Festival, Audio Art Festival, NWEAMO, REV01, BEAP, the NowNow, What is Music, The Knitting Factory, Make-it-Now, DC 8th International Dance+ Improvisation Festival, SDSU, University of Illinois, STEIM, HarvestWorks,  CEMI and Kyoto Seika University.

Honours and awards 
Honours include a Sounds Australian Award (1989) and a Churchill Fellowship (1995) to study electronic music in the United States and Europe.

Selected works 
 Twilight's Last Gleamings (1986): in Reeds (Ed. Ross Hazeldine) Red House Editions RH943
 Savoy Trifle (1988): Alto Saxophone, Percussion and Piano 
 Blackpool Tower: Elegy for John Lennon (1989): Clarinet, Guitar, Percussion and Piano 
 Leo Szilard (1990): Soprano, Tenor and Baritone Saxophone, Piano, Marimba, Cello and Bass Guitar
 cyphers of the obscure gods (1991): Tenor Saxophone, Cello, Synthesizer and Percussion
 Zealous Activity (1992): in Australian Piano Miniatures (Ed. Ross Hazeldine) Red House Editions RH947 
 Web of Indra (1993): Soprano Saxophone, Cello, Percussion and Keyboard 
 [descent of the celestial monkey wrench] (1997), 2 Sopranos, saxophone, cello, piano and percussion 
 strange tides (redraw my boundaries) (1997): solo soprano saxophone and digital delay 
 Oubliette (1998): in Australian Guitar Miniatures (Ed. Ross Hazeldine) Red House Editions RH947 
 whythisandnotanother? (1999): score-film, interactive audio, saxophone, cello, and KAT
 noir (1999): MIBURI, Roland 505, tenor saxophone, piano, samplers and MIDI controlled lights
 horology (1999): flute, clarinet, violin, cello, piano and marimba and percussion
 delicious ironies series (2001–): live instrument(s) and electronics
 rendez-vous: an opera noir (2001): after the Novel Djinn by Alain Robbe-Grillet. Libretto by the Composer: 2 Sopranos, Mezzo, Baritone, Boy Actor and Male Actor, Violin, Cello, Saxophone, Piano,  
 Splice (2002): soloist and Max/MSP software
 invisible symmetries (2002): violin, soprano saxophone, double bass, percussion and piano 
 InterXection (2002): percussion and electronics 
 your sky is filled with billboards of the sky (2002): MIBURI, Max/MSP and Image-ine.
 Scan (2002): MIBURI and interactive video/sound
 Kreuz des Suedens (2003): violin and cello 
 Hey Jazz Fans! (2003): solo alto saxophone and MAX/MSP 
 Parallel Trajectories (2003): ensemble 
 Exit Points (2003): soprano saxophone, violin, viola, double bass, piano 
 éraflage (2007): flute, harp, string quartet, double bass and percussion 
 Tectonic (2007), wind, brass, string, percussion and piano groups and electronics
 corridors, stairways, night and day (2009): bass clarinet and interactive electronics 
 Antibody (2009): alto flute, clarinet, viola, cello, keyboard and electronics
With Graham Collier
Bread and Circuses (Jazzprint, 2002)

References

Further reading
 Broadstock, Brenton, (1995). Sound Ideas: Australian Composers Born since 1950, Australian Music Centre    pp. 237–8
 Burt, W. (1991). “Experimental Music in Australia using live electronics” in New instruments for the performance of electronic music (Ed. Nelson P. and Montague, P.), CRC Press/Taylor and Francis: London.
 Burtt, J., Lavers, K., and Vickery, L. (2004). “Representations of recombinant memory in interactive performance works”, in Proceedings of Qi + Complexity Consciousness reframed Conference 2004, Beijing China. 
 Dean, R.T., (2003). Hyperimprovisation : Computer Interactive Sound Improvisation, A-R Editions, Madison, WI. P. 161
 Hope, C. (2008). “Cultural terrorism and anti-music: Noise music and its impact on experimental music in Australia”, in Experimental Music: Audio Explorations in Australia, (Gail Priest Editor), University of New South Wales Press; p. 63
 Lieberman, D., (2006). “Game Enhanced Music Manuscript”, in GRAPHITE '06: Proceedings of the 4th International Conference on Computer Graphics and Interactive Techniques in Australasia and * South East Asia, ACM Press, Melbourne, Australia, pp. 245 – 250.
 MacQueen, B. (ed.)(1993). “Lindsay Vickery”, in Lowdown magazine Volume 16 No. 3 (JUNE)
 Mustard, J. (2002). “Correlating Movement In Space To The Parameters Of Sound” in Proceedings of the 2002 Australasian Computer Music Conference.
 Mustard, J. (2005). “Invisible Symmetries: A retrospective of the work of Lindsay Vickery”, in SOUND SCRIPTS: Proceedings of the Inaugural Totally Huge New Music Festival Conference 2005, pp. 33–41
 Mustard, J. (2005). “Invisible Symmetries: A retrospective of the work of Lindsay Vickery”, in SOUND SCRIPTS: Proceedings of the Inaugural Totally Huge New Music Festival Conference 2005, pp. 33–41 p. 33
 Robbe-Grillet, A., 1981–85. DJINN: un trou rouge entre les pavés disjoints. Paris, Les Éditions de Minuit
 Slater, D. (1998). “The Sound of Movement”, in CIO Magazine 15 July 1998
 Vickery, L. (1991). “Two Pieces and an Overview”, in New Music Articles 9  (Guest Ed. Ross Bolleter).
 Vickery, L. (2001). “The Western Edge: some recent electronic music from Western Australia”, in Organised Sound issue 6/1 Music Technology in Australasia/South East Asia (Ed. Leigh Landy and Tony Myatt), Cambridge University Press. 
 Vickery, L. (2002). “The RoboSax Project (1991–2001): forms of performer/machine interaction in works by Jonathan Mustard and Lindsay Vickery”, in Proceedings of the Australian Computer Music Conference 2002, RMIT Melbourne. 
 Vickery, L. (2002). “The Yamaha MIBURI MIDI jump suit as a controller for STEIM’s Interactive Video software Image/ine”, in Proceedings of the Australian Computer Music Conference 2002, RMIT Melbourne.
 Vickery, L. (2003). “Non-linear structures for real-time interactive musical works”, in Proceedings of the Australasian Computer Music Conference 2003, WAAPA, Edith Cowan University Perth.
 Vickery, L. (2004). “Interactive control of higher order musical structures”, in Proceedings of the Australasian Computer Music Conference 2004, Victoria University, Wellington New Zealand. 
 Vickery, L. (2005). “Western Electric: a survey of recent Western Australian Electronic Music”, in SOUND SCRIPTS: Proceedings of the Inaugural Totally Huge New Music Festival Conference 2005, pp. 24–32
 Willett, A. (2006). Rendez-vous: an Opera Noir, Honours Thesis, Edith Cowan University

External links 
 Beck, Andrew. (2002). “Totally Huge: landscape/soundscape” in Realtime 48 April–May 2002
  Piringer, Jörg. (2001). Elektronische Musik und Interaktivität: Prinzipien, Konzepte, Anwendungen, Master’s Thesis, Institut fur Gestaltungs und Wirkungsforschung der Technischen Universität Wien, p. 103
 Priest, Gail. (2002). New Media Scan 2002: “sound, music Looping forward: the analogue/digital dialogue”, in Realtime 51 Oct–Nov 2002
 Vickery, Lindsay Cube Culture: The Alternative Controller

1965 births
20th-century classical composers
21st-century classical composers
Australian male classical composers
Australian opera composers
Living people
Male opera composers
Musicians from Perth, Western Australia
University of Western Australia alumni
20th-century Australian male musicians
20th-century Australian musicians
21st-century Australian male musicians
21st-century Australian musicians